Kevin Tyrell Dodd (born July 14, 1992) is a former American football outside linebacker who played in the National Football League (NFL). He was drafted by the Tennessee Titans in the second round of the 2016 NFL Draft. He played college football at Clemson.

Early years
Dodd attended Riverside High School in Greer, South Carolina. As a senior, he had 78 tackles and nine sacks. He committed to Clemson University to play college football. Dodd spent a year at Hargrave Military Academy after graduating from high school.

College career
Dodd played in 24 games and had 20 tackles as a backup his first three years at Clemson from 2012 to 2014. In 2015, Dodd became a starter for the first time and recorded 60 tackles and 12 sacks. During Clemson's loss to Alabama in the 2016 College Football Playoff National Championship, he had seven tackles and three sacks.

Professional career

Dodd was drafted by the Tennessee Titans in the second round (33rd overall) of the 2016 NFL Draft. He recorded his first sack in his first full start against the Detroit Lions in Week 2 after replacing an injured Derrick Morgan. He was placed on injured reserve on December 5, 2016 after re-injuring his foot from early in the offseason.

Dodd finished the 2017 season with 7 tackles and no sacks.

On July 24, 2018, Dodd was waived by the Titans after failing to report to training camp.

References

External links
Tennessee Titans bio
Clemson Tigers bio

1992 births
Living people
American football defensive ends
Clemson Tigers football players
Players of American football from South Carolina
Sportspeople from Greenville, South Carolina
Tennessee Titans players